Kami Garcia (born March 25, 1972) is an American writer. She is known for writing young adult fiction and graphic novels for DC Comics.

Life
She grew up in the Washington, D.C. area, but currently resides in Los Angeles, California. 
Garcia is a teacher and reading specialist with an MA in education, and leads book groups for children and teenagers. She formerly taught in the Washington D.C. area until she moved to Los Angeles. In addition to teaching, she was a professional artist.

Career

Caster Chronicles series
She is the co-author along with her friend Margaret Stohl of the Caster Chronicles book series, starting with Beautiful Creatures. The series currently consists of four books and a novella and is generally classified as a contemporary young adult fantasy novel, with particular interest for teens. It is set in the fictional small town of Gatlin, South Carolina in the Southern United States, and deals with a group of townspeople, friends, witches (called "Casters" in the books), and numerous other magical creatures.

The first book, Beautiful Creatures reached International Bestseller Status and is on The New York Times Best Seller List. 
It has been published in 50 countries and translated into 39 languages. It was made into the 2013 film Beautiful Creatures and has also been turned into a graphic novel.

Graphic novels
Garcia and Brazilian artist Gabriel Picolo have created three Teen Titans young adult graphic novels for DC Comics. The graphic novels have told stories about Teen Titans characters Raven and Beast Boy.

Personal life
She is married to Alex Garcia, a video game producer. They have two children together.

Bibliography

Novels

 Broken Beautiful Hearts (2018; Imprint) – 
 The Lovely Reckless (2016; Imprint) –

The X-Files Origins 

 The X-Files Origins #1: Agent of Chaos (2017; Imprint) –

Caster Chronicles series 
 Beautiful Creatures (2009) –  
 Beautiful Darkness (2010) –  
 Dream Dark (2011) e-novella only
 Beautiful Chaos (2011) –  
 Beautiful Redemption (2012) –

Dangerous Creatures series (Caster Chronicles spin-offs) 
 Dangerous Dream (2013) e-novella only
 Dangerous Creatures (2014) –  
 Dangerous Deception (2015) –

Legion series

Short stories
 "Red Run", published in Enthralled: Paranormal Diversions (2011) –  
 "Improbable Futures"

Graphic novels

Teen Titans 
 Teen Titans: Raven (2019; DC Ink) – 
 Teen Titans: Beast Boy (2020; DC Ink) – 
 Teen Titans: Beast Boy Loves Raven (2021; DC Ink) – 
 Teen Titans: Robin (2023; DC Ink) - ISBN 1779512244

Comic books
 Joker/Harley: Criminal Sanity #1 - #8 (October 9, 2019 – April 7, 2021)

Awards

References

External links

 
 

1972 births
Living people
21st-century American novelists
21st-century American short story writers
American women novelists
American women short story writers
Women science fiction and fantasy writers
21st-century American women writers